HD 102195 b (also called ET-1) is an extrasolar planet orbiting the star HD 102195 in the constellation of Virgo, discovered in January 2006. It is the first planet discovered by the Exoplanet Tracker project, using a dispersed fixed-delay interferometer. The planet is an example of a hot Jupiter, and is likely to be a gas giant based on its mass.

The planet HD 102195 b is named Lete. The name was selected in the NameExoWorlds campaign by Italy, during the 100th anniversary of the IAU. Lete is the oblivion river made of fog from Greek Mythology in the Italian narrative poem on the afterlife Divina Commedia.

References

External links 
 

Hot Jupiters
Exoplanets discovered in 2006
Giant planets
Virgo (constellation)
Exoplanets detected by radial velocity
Exoplanets with proper names